Evo Street Racers (commonly referred to as “Evo”) is a motorsports organization that assists in the evolution of illegal street racers into motorsports racers.

History
The organization was founded in 2003 by Bryan Harrison as a result of the defunct efforts of many motorsports associations and organizations to reduce the street racing problem. 

Whereas many organizations focused only on events to solve the illegal street racing problem, Evo looks to solve the problem on and off the track as their representatives go into the environment where the acts take place.

Since Evo's inception their efforts have been received as an organization that works towards unifying all the affected parties into a comprehensive unified action plan. As a result of their local and global efforts Evo has been featured on many media outlets including, Good Morning America, National Public Radio (NPR), ESPN, and CNN.

Their main program is entitled the "Evolution Solution". The three major stages or goals of the program are: 

Stage 1: Create and encourage legal and safe motorsports events
Stage 2: Design, implement, and promote community inclusion programs
Stage 3: Lobby for stricter penalties, effective legislation, and consistent law enforcement techniques

The organization offers a large database of topics relating to illegal street racing including; accidents, statistics, legislation, enforcement techniques, photo galleries, and general news. Their research department also runs a range of studies covering topics such as illegal street racing terminology, locations, fatalities, and incidence.

In addition to the specific solutions to the illegal street racing problem Evo runs a motorsports event called "Beat the Badge". The event features an opportunity to race against police officers in their active cruisers, a grudge match, a test and tune, and an afterdark race.

The parent company of Evo Street Racers, Street Scene Revolution, also operates another racing event which is focused towards the street scene called the "Super Bowl of Street Racing".

References

Auto racing organizations in the United States
Drag racing organizations
Hazardous motor vehicle activities
2003 establishments in the United States